Libuše Benešová (born 5 July 1948) is a Czech politician who served as the President of the Senate from 1998 to 2000. Benešová was elected Senator from Benešov in the 1996 election, serving until 2000. After running for re-election as Senator for Benešov in 2000, she finished second behind Four-Coalition candidate Helena Rögnerová, who resultantly succeeded her.

References

1948 births
People from Benešov
Charles University alumni
Civic Democratic Party (Czech Republic) Senators
Living people
Presidents of the Senate of the Czech Republic